Gizela Farkaš Todorović (born 22 October 1942, in Novi Sad) is a Serbian former middle distance runner who ran for Yugoslavia in the 800m semi final at the 1964 Summer Olympics.

External links

1942 births
Living people
Sportspeople from Novi Sad
Serbian female middle-distance runners
Olympic athletes of Yugoslavia
Athletes (track and field) at the 1964 Summer Olympics
Yugoslav female middle-distance runners